Grid, The Grid, or GRID may refer to:

Common usage
 Cattle grid or stock grid, a type of obstacle is used to prevent livestock from crossing the road
 Grid reference, used to define a location on a map

Arts, entertainment, and media
 News grid, used in communications/public relations

Fictional entities
 Grid (comics), a fictional character in the DC Comics Universe
 Grid (Jotun), Gríðr, a giantess in Norse mythology
 Grid, a Xenomorph from Alien vs Predator
 The grid, the virtual environment of the game Second Life
 The Grid, the computerized virtual world in which the Tron franchise exists

Games and gaming
 Nvidia GRID, a cloud gaming platform for Nvidia Tegra products
 Power Grid, the English-language edition of the multiplayer German-style board game Funkenschlag
 Grid (series), a series of racing video games developed by Codemasters
 Spooks 3 Games - The Grid, a video game based on the television show Spooks
 The Grid (video game), a 2001 third-person shooter

Music
 Grid (album), the eighth original album by the Japanese band m.o.v.e., 2006
 GRid, Global Release Identifier (GRid), a music industry identifier from the RIAA and IFPI
 Kevorkian Death Cycle, a music group formerly called Grid
 The Grid, a 1990s electronic dance group, from London
 "The Grid", a song by To My Boy

Periodicals
 IEEE Grid, a monthly publication of the Institute of Electrical and Electronics Engineers
 The Grid (newspaper), a former alternative weekly newspaper in Toronto, Ontario
 Grid Network, an Indonesian media publisher operated by Kompas Gramedia

Sports
 Gridiron football or "gridiron", a team-based sports game ("the grid" also refers to the playing-field)
 National Pro Grid League, a professional co-ed athletic team competition
 Starting grid, the positioning of vehicles for starting a motorsport race

Television
 The Grid (TV serial), a BBC drama from 2004
 "The Grid" (The Outer Limits), an episode of the science fiction series, 2000
 The Grid (American TV series), an American TV series, on IFC
 Mobil 1 The Grid, a motorsport magazine TV show, on Channel 4
 Grid (South Korean TV series), a 2022 streaming television series

Design and planning
 Grid (graphic design) or typographic grid, organized lines for guiding graphic design
 Grid paper, or graph paper, the writing paper that is printed with fine lines making up a regular grid
 Grid plan, a method of city and regional planning in which streets and administrative units are arranged at right angles
 Managerial grid model, a behavioral leadership model
 Tension grid, an area of a theatre
 CSS grid layout, a CSS layout that works well with Flexbox

Place names
 Grid, a village administered by Călan town, Hunedoara County, Romania
 Grid, a village in Părău Commune, Braşov County, Romania
 Grid, a tributary of the river Valea Luncanilor in Hunedoara County, Romania
 Grid, a tributary of the river Părău in Brașov County, Romania

Science and technology
 Control grid, an electrode to control electrons in vacuum tubes
 Electrical grid, a network for delivering electricity
 Screen grid, a grid used in vacuum tubes to reduce capacitance
 Suppressor grid, a grid used in vacuum tubes to suppress secondary emission

Biology and healthcare
 Gay-related immune deficiency, or GRID, an early suggested name for AIDS
 GRID1, a human gene
 GRID2, a human gene

Computing 
 GRID, Global Research Identifier Database ID (grid), an openly-available, persistent ID for research institutions worldwide, providing linked metadata, created and updated by Digital Science
 Grid computing, the application of a network of computers to a single problem
 Computation grid, or mesh, the outcome of using principles of grid generation to divide a complex shape into simple cells for simulations or computer graphics
 Data grid, middleware services that pull together data and resources from multiple domains 
 Esri grid, a file format for geographic information systems
 Grid view, a graphical control element (software widget) that presents a tabular view of data

Mathematics
 GRID (geometry) (Great Rhomb-Icosi-Dodecahedron) or truncated icosidodecahedron
 Grid (spatial index), the information-organizing scheme
 Lattice graph or "grid graph", a graph formed from a regular lattice of vertices
 Regular grid, a tessellation of Euclidean space

Other uses
 Firebird Grid, a German paraglider design
 Grid power
 Grid Systems Corporation, the developer of historic laptops, founded in 1979

See also

 
 
 
 
 Mesh (disambiguation)